The Provisional Irish Republican Army (IRA) targeted the Northern Ireland Forensic Science Laboratory (NIFSL) facilities on Newtownbreda Road in the southern outskirts of Belfast with a large 3,000 lb bomb on 23 September 1992. The huge impact of the bomb destroyed the lab and damaged over 1,000 homes within a 1.5 mile radius, including adjacent Belvoir Park, a Protestant housing estate. It was one of the biggest bombs ever detonated during Northern Ireland's Troubles, causing massive damage and being felt from over 10 miles away. Hundreds of residents had to be treated for shock. Several military vehicles were damaged. The lab was a key target because it analysed evidence in cases involving IRA attacks. The IRA had given a warning, and British Army bomb disposal experts were investigating an abandoned van when the explosion occurred. One estimate put the repair damage cost at £20 million at the time.

According to journalist and author Toby Harnden, the attack, from beginning to end was planned and carried out by the IRA South Armagh Brigade. Volunteers from the brigade hijacked a truck near Newry and packed it with explosives weighing . They left the truck outside the Forensic Science Laboratory at 8:40pm, nearly 45 minutes later after a coded warning the bomb exploded.

See also
Teebane bombing
Attack on Cloghoge checkpoint
Provisional Irish Republican Army campaign 1969–1997

References

1992 in Northern Ireland
Explosions in 1992
1992 crimes in the United Kingdom
September 1992 events in the United Kingdom
Provisional Irish Republican Army actions
Car and truck bombings in Northern Ireland